The Green EP may refer to:

 The Green EP (Bibio EP), 2014
 The Green EP (Professor Green EP), 2008

See also
 The Green Album (disambiguation)
 Green Tour EP, by The Album Leaf